Devlekar is an Indian surname. Notable people with the surname include:

Rajendra Devlekar (1966–2020), Indian politician
Vighnesh Devlekar (born 1996), Indian badminton player 

Indian surnames
Surnames of Indian origin